A chalet is a type of building or house, typical of the Alpine region in Europe.

Chalet or variations thereof may also refer to:

Arts and entertainment
 Le chalet, an 1834 French opéra comique in one act
 The Chalet (TV series), a six-episode French series
 The Chalets, an Irish band active from 2001 to 2008
 Laurent Chalet (born 1969), French cinematographer

Other uses
 Vortex (satellite), formerly called Chalet, a class of American spy satellite
 Chalet (typeface), a series of fonts based on Helvetica
 The Chalet, Hunters Hill, a heritage-listed residence in Hunter's Hill, New South Wales, Australia
 Chalet, Una, a village in Himachal Pradesh, India
 CHALET, a mnemonic for a UK emergency services protocol

See also 
 The Chalet (disambiguation)
 Le Locle Le Chalet railway station, also known as Le Chalet NE, Le Locle, Neuchâtel, Switzerland
 Cholet (disambiguation)